USFR Media Group (corporate name U.S. Farm & Ranch Supply Company, Inc.) is a media company based in Houston, Texas. Founded by Griffen Farrell. USFR publishes the Western lifestyle magazines Western & English Today and Cowboys & Indians. It formerly owned KTBU Channel 55 in Houston and the America One television network (through VOTH Network, Inc.) from the network's launch in 1995 until it was sold in a shareholder buyout in 2009.

References

External links
Official USFR Media Group Site
KTBU website
American One website (still active, but not functional)
Western & English Today site 
Cowboys and Indians Magazine site

Defunct television broadcasting companies of the United States
Companies based in Houston
Publishing companies of the United States
Mass media companies established in 2000
Mass media companies disestablished in 2009
2000 establishments in Texas
2009 disestablishments in Texas